Kenny Aronoff (born 7 March 1953) is an American drummer originally from Massachusetts. He's played in backing bands for singers such as John Mellencamp and John Fogarty, plus session work on many albums and TV shows. He has taught drumming at the college level and owns a recording studio as well. His drumming skills have been recognized by magazines such as Rolling Stone and Modern Drummer.

Early life
Aronoff was born to a Jewish family and grew up in Stockbridge, Massachusetts. He developed an interest in music at an early age and gravitated to the drums as "drumming was one hundred percent energy." He studied classical music in college both at the University of Massachusetts and Indiana University where he graduated in 1976. Many classical orchestras offered him a timpani percussion position which he declined in order to study jazz and fusion drum set work, before joining some bands in Indiana.

Career
In 1980, Aronoff joined John Cougar's band, and remained  for 17 years.

Throughout his career, Aronoff has toured or recorded with such artists as the Smashing Pumpkins, Bob Seger, Willie Nelson, John Fogerty, Michelle Branch, Tony Iommi, Melissa Etheridge, Jerry Lee Lewis, Lynyrd Skynyrd, and Jon Bon Jovi.

Kenny Aronoff has played drums for John Fogerty live and on records since 1996.

Aronoff was Associate Professor of Percussion at Indiana University from 1993–1997. Each year, The Aronoff Percussion Scholarship is awarded to an Indiana University percussion student.

Kenny Aronoff was an inaugural member of the Independent Music Awards' 2001 first Annual IMA judging panel to support independent artists. He performed at the Kennedy Center Honors from 2008–2014. On January 26, 2014, Aronoff performed at the 56th Annual Grammy Awards with Ringo Starr.

Aronoff joined Paul McCartney and Ringo Starr in the CBS special The Night That Changed America: A Grammy Salute to the Beatles, that aired on February 9, 2014.

He owns Uncommon Studios L.A.

Recognition
On March 31, 2016, Rolling Stone ranked Kenny Aronoff number 66 of the 100 greatest drummers of all time. The magazine wrote, "With a sixth sense for what makes music pop and the patience to take direction, he's ended up as a go-to studio beatsmith for the Rolling Stones, Bob Dylan, Bruce Springsteen, Neil Diamond, Eric Clapton, John Fogerty, Sting, the Smashing Pumpkins, Lady Gaga and tons more."

Modern Drummer named Kenny Aronoff the "#1 Pop/Rock Drummer and #1 Studio Drummer" for five consecutive years.

References

External links

2012 Audio Interview with Kenny Aronoff from the Podcast "I'd Hit That"
Kenny Aronoff Interview NAMM Oral History Library (2017)

Living people
American rock drummers
Jewish American musicians
People from Studio City, Los Angeles
20th-century American drummers
21st-century American drummers
American male drummers
People from Stockbridge, Massachusetts
American people of Jewish descent
Lyle Lovett and His Large Band members